James Roscoe Miller (October 26, 1905 – October 16, 1977) was the twelfth president of Northwestern University, serving between 1949 and 1970.

During his tenure, Northwestern substantially increased the size of its Evanston campus, constructing many new buildings on adjacent land reclaimed by filling in Lake Michigan. Furthermore, the university's academic programs were strengthened, the faculty was expanded, and enrollment was increased.

Between 1962 and 1964, the James Roscoe Miller Campus (more commonly known as the Lakefill) was constructed to provide land for expansion of the University by extending the eastern edge of the campus  into Lake Michigan.

Miller attended the University of Utah, where he was a member of the Sigma Chi fraternity.

References

http://www.encyclopedia.chicagohistory.org/pages/910.html

External links 
Northwestern University Archives, Biography of J. Roscoe Miller

1905 births
1977 deaths
University of Utah alumni
Northwestern University faculty
Presidents of Northwestern University
20th-century American academics